The 2022 Sultan of Johor Cup was the tenth edition of the Sultan of Johor Cup, an international men's under–21 field hockey tournament in Malaysia. It was held in Johor Bahru, Malaysia from 22 to 29 October 2022.

As in previous editions, a total of six teams competed for the title.

Participating nations
Including the host nation, 6 teams competed in the tournament.

Results
All times are in Malaysia Standard Time (UTC+8).

Preliminary round

Classification round

Fifth and sixth place

Third and fourth place

Final

Final standings

Goalscorers

See also
2022 Sultan Azlan Shah Cup

References

External links

Sultan of Johor Cup
Sultan of Johor Cup
Sultan of Johor Cup
Sultan of Johor Cup
Sultan of Johor Cup